Bauserman Farm, also known as Kagey-Bauserman Farm, is a historic farmstead located near Mount Jackson, Shenandoah County, Virginia. The main house was built about 1860, and is a two-story, three-bay, gable-roofed,  balloon-framed “I-house.” It has an integral rear ell, wide front porch and handsome late-Victorian scroll-sawn wood decoration.  Also on the property are the contributing chicken house (early 1800s), a privy (early 1800s), a two-story summer kitchen (ca. 1823), a frame granary (ca. 1893), a large bank barn (ca. 1893), a chicken house (ca. 1940), the foundation of the former circular icehouse (early-19th century) and the foundation of a former one-room log cabin (early 1800s).

It was listed on the National Register of Historic Places in 2010.

References

Farms on the National Register of Historic Places in Virginia
Houses completed in 1860
Victorian architecture in Virginia
Houses in Shenandoah County, Virginia
National Register of Historic Places in Shenandoah County, Virginia
Mount Jackson, Virginia